Ripley may refer to:

People and characters
 Ripley (name)
 Ripley, the test mannequin aboard the first International Space Station space station Dragon 2 space test flight Crew Dragon Demo-1
 Ellen Ripley, a fictional character from the Alien sci-fi-horror franchise

Places

England 
Ripley, Derbyshire
Ripley, North Yorkshire
Ripley, Surrey

United States 
Ripley, California
Ripley, Georgia
Ripley, Illinois
Ripley, Indiana
Ripley, Maine
Ripley, Maryland
Ripley, Michigan
Ripley, Mississippi
Ripley, Independence, Missouri
Ripley, New York, a town
Ripley (CDP), New York, a census-designated place in the town
Ripley, Ohio
Ripley, Oklahoma
Ripley, Tennessee
Ripley, West Virginia
 Old Ripley, Illinois
 Ripley County, Indiana
 Ripley County, Missouri
 Ripley Township, Dodge County, Minnesota
 Ripley Township, Morrison County, Minnesota

Other countries 
 Ripley, Queensland, Australia
 Ripley, Ontario, Canada

Other places
 Camp Ripley, a military and civilian training facility near Little Falls, Minnesota, U.S.
 Ripley Castle, Yorkshire, England, UK
 Ripley (crater), a crater on Pluto's moon Charon named after Ellen Ripley in the 1979 SF movie Alien
 Ripley Formation, a geological formation in the U.S. states of Alabama, Georgia, Mississippi, Missouri, and Tennessee

Other uses
 Ripley machine gun
 Ripley S.A., Chilean retailer
 Ripley St Thomas Church of England Academy
 The Ripley, a fictional virus created by author Stephen King for the novel Dreamcatcher

See also 

 Ripley's Believe It or Not! ("Ripley's"), an American franchise founded by Robert Ripley
 
 Fort Ripley (disambiguation)
 Ripley County (disambiguation)
 Ripley High School (disambiguation)
 Ripley Historic District (disambiguation)
 Ripley House (disambiguation)
 Ripley Township (disambiguation)